Banana Research Station, Kannara is a research Station under the Central Zone of Kerala Agricultural University at Kannara in Thrissur district of Kerala, India.

This research Station was established in 1963 to carry out research on bananas and pineapples. The station was brought under the All India Co-ordinated Fruit Improvement Project of the ICAR in 1970. 

When Kerala Agricultural University was established in 1972, Banana Research Station, Kannara was taken over by KAU. This station successfully developed tissue culture banana farming in 2011.

References

External links
Official Website
Bananas For Kidneys

Bananas
Education in Thrissur district
Agricultural research stations in Kerala
Horticulture in India
1963 establishments in Kerala
Research institutes established in 1963